Thomas More Storke (November 23, 1876 – October 12, 1971) was an American journalist, politician, postmaster, and publisher. He was awarded with the famous Pulitzer Prize for Journalism in 1962.  Storke also served as an interim United States Senator, appointed to serve between the resignation of William Gibbs McAdoo in November 1938 and the January 1939 swearing-in of Sheridan Downey, who had been elected to succeed McAdoo.

Early life and journalism career 
Born in Santa Barbara, Storke was an only child who grew up bilingual in Spanish and English and was born to eminent local citizen and politician Charles A. Storke and Martha Storke. Through his mother he was descended from the Ortega and Olivera families. As a child he attended public schools and moved on to Stanford University one year early with a degree in Economics. Storke graduated in 1898 at age 22.

In 1900, Storke borrowed $2,000 and went on to buy the Santa Barbara Daily Independent, the least favored newspaper in town. In 1909 he sold the outlet to get into the oil business and later purchased the Santa Barbara Daily News in 1913. The spring prior, he was appointed as the Santa Barbara postmaster. Storke readopted the Daily Independent and combined that with the Daily News to birth the Santa Barbara Daily News & Independent. Years later, Storke bought The Morning Press, Santa Barbara's third paper. He later combined the two making The News-Press. After 23 years, it was sold for near 10 million dollars to the publisher of The Philadelphia Bulletin.

Later life and political career 
A Democrat in politics, on November 9, 1938, Storke was appointed as to the United States Senate to fill the vacancy caused by the resignation of William Gibbs McAdoo.  Storke had not been a candidate in the 1938 election, and served until the January 3, 1939 swearing-in of Sheridan Downey, who had been elected as McAdoo's successor. Storke flew to Washington and was sworn in by Edwin H. Halsey, the Secretary of the Senate. However, Congress was not in session during the time he was in office, so Storke never authored any legislation or cast a Senate vote.

He returned home and resumed working in the media, merging his newspaper the Santa Barbara News with the Morning Press to create the Santa Barbara News-Press. He also founded AM radio station KTMS. He was a member of the California Crime Commission from 1951–1952, and the Board of Regents of the University of California from 1955 until 1960.

In 1958 Storke wrote California Editor, a lengthy memoir rich in local Santa Barbara history.

The John Birch Society attacked the Eisenhower administration and U.S. Chief Justice Earl Warren as being communists in 1961. Storke responded with a caustic series of editorials in the News-Press which won him popular acclaim as well as a number of prizes. These included the Pulitzer Prize in Journalism, for Editorial Writing in 1962, the Elijah Parish Lovejoy Award, and an honorary Doctor of Laws degree from Colby College.

Storke's death was caused by a stroke in 1971 at age 94, having had 10 grandchildren and 9 great-grandchildren.

Contributions 
Storke used his political clout to help obtain the present UCSB campus, over 900 coastal acres (3.6 km2) and a former military installation, from the US Government under the college land grant program.

Part of Storke's lasting legacy is Storke Tower, a 190-foot structure in the center of the UCSB campus, being the tallest tower in the county as well as the only five-octave chromatic bell system.

Beneath Storke Tower is the Storke Communication Plaza, which houses the offices of the campus Daily Nexus newspaper and the studios of community radio station KCSB-FM.

See also
History of Santa Barbara, California

Notes

References
 Baker, Gayle.  Santa Barbara.  Harbor Town Histories, Santa Barbara.  2003.  
 Tompkins, Walker A. Santa Barbara History Makers.  McNally & Loftin, Santa Barbara.  1983.  
 Storke, Thomas M. California Editor.  Westernlore, Los Angeles.  1958.

External links

Guide to the Thomas More Storke Papers at The Bancroft Library

1876 births
1971 deaths
California postmasters
Citrus farmers
Elijah Parish Lovejoy Award recipients
Pulitzer Prize for Editorial Writing winners
People from Santa Barbara, California
University of California regents
Democratic Party United States senators from California
California Democrats
Journalists from California
Burials at Santa Barbara Cemetery